Johan Falkberget, born Johan Petter Lillebakken, (30 September 1879 – 5 April 1967) was a Norwegian author. He was nominated for the Nobel Prize in Literature.

Life and career

Johan Falkberget was born on the Lillebakken farm in the Rugldal valley in the Norwegian copper mining municipality of Røros.

In 1891, he began to write his Christianus Sextus trilogy, though it was not published until later. He formally changed his surname for writing purposes in 1893, from Lillebakken to Falkberget—the name of the farm he then lived on (this was a normal practice in those days). His first work was published in 1902. In 1906 he quit his job as a miner and found a job as editor of the newspaper «Nybrott» in Ålesund. In 1908 he traveled to Fredrikstad and edited «Smaalenes Socialdemokrat». He then received a government-sponsored scholarship and traveled to Kirkenes. From 1909 till 1922 his primary residence and workplace was in Kristiania (now Oslo).

In 1922 he returned to Røros and lived on the Ratvolden farm, less than 1 km from the Falkberget farm. His Ratvolden house is now a museum.  While living there, he represented the Norwegian Labour Party (Arbeiderpartiet) for Sør-Trøndelag in the Storting from 1931 to 1933.

Since he grew up in a mining area and began his career as a miner, his works drew extensively on his experiences with the people, the country culture and mining. His breakthrough work in 1923 was a novel titled Den fjerde nattevakt (The Fourth Night Watch), a historical novel set in the first half of the 19th century in and around the mines. This was followed by his «Christianus Sextus» trilogy, set in the 1720s, in which the mining culture is also a central theme. Falkberget contributed extensively to the newspaper Fjell-Ljom.

After a long and productive life, he died on 5 April 1967 and is buried in the family plot in the upper churchyard at Røros.

Authorship
"The miners' toil and rhythm of life became the fulcrum of Falkberget's literature", according to Sturle Kojen (a biographer).

Important works 
Many of his works are not available in English translation. Those that are, have been noted with the English equivalent title next to the Norwegian title.

1902 Når livskvelden kjem - Forteljing
1903 Bjarne - Et billede fra en fjellbygd
1905 Vaarsus - Fortælling
1905 Moseflyer - Skitser og sagn fra Dovrefjeld
1906 Hauk Uglevatn - Fortælling fra Dovrefjeld
1907 Svarte Fjelde - Fortælling
1908 Mineskud
1908 Ved den evige sne - Fortælling I
1909 Fakkelbrand
1909 Urtidsnat
1910 Vargfjeldet - Smaa fortællinger
1910 Nord i haugene - Eventyr
1911 Fimbulvinter
1912 En finnejentes kjærlighetshistorie
1912 Jutul-historier - Fortalt av 'n Soplim-Tosten sjøl
1913 Eli Sjursdotter
1913 Eventyr. Nord i Haugene og Jutulhistorier
1914 Simen Mustrøen. Karikaturkomedie
1914 Av Jarleæt
1915 Lisbet paa Jarnfjeld
1916 Eventyrfjeld. Historier for barn
1916 Helleristninger. Historier fra fjeldet og jagten
1917 Brændoffer
1918 Rott jer sammen
1918 Sol. En historie fra 1600 tallet
1919 Barkebrødstider - Nye fortællinger
1919 Vidden - Fortællinger
1919 Bjørneskytteren
1920 Bør Børson - Olderdalens største sønn
1920 Byd lykken haanden eller da Johannes Mo løste rebusen
1920 Bør Børson jr.
1921 Naglerne. Eller jernet fra Norden og andre fortellinger
1923 Den fjerde nattevakt (The Fourth Night Watch)
1924 I Nordenvindens land
1925 Vers fra Rugelsjøen
1926 Anders Reitan. Liv og virke 1826-1926
1927 Den nye Bør Børson jr.
1927 Christianus Sextus. De første geseller (CHRISTIANUS SEXTUS - trilogy: The First Journeyman)
1928 Det høie fjeld
1928 Solfrid i Bjørnstu og de syv svende
1929 I forbifarten
1931 Christianus Sextus. I hammerens tegn (CHRISTIANUS SEXTUS - trilogy: The Sign of the Hammer)
1933 Der stenene taler
1935 Christianus Sextus. Tårnvekteren(CHRISTIANUS SEXTUS - trilogy: The Tower Watch)
1936 I vakttårnet
1940 Nattens Brød. An-Magritt
1944 Runer på fjellveggen. Sagn og fortellinger
1946 Nattens Brød. Plogjernet (The Plough)
1948 I lyset fra min bergmannslampe
1952 Nattens Brød. Johannes
1959 Nattens Brød. Kjærlighets veier (Love's Way)
1963 Jeg så dem --
1964 Vers fra Rugelsjøen og andre dikt

Awards
 Gyldendal's Endowment for 1939
 Nominated for the Nobel Prize thirty-six times.

References

External links

NRK:  Johan Falkberget
Family genealogy

1879 births
1967 deaths
20th-century Norwegian novelists
Norwegian male writers
Labour Party (Norway) politicians
Members of the Storting
Sør-Trøndelag politicians
People from Røros
Dobloug Prize winners